Force 10 may refer to:
 Force 10 From Navarone, a World War II novel by Scottish author Alistair MacLean published in 1968
 Force 10 from Navarone (film), a war film based on the novel
 Force 10 on the Beaufort scale of wind speed
 Force Ten, a model of tent made by British firm Vango
 Gull Force 10, a fuel brand in New Zealand
 Force10, an American computer networking company
 Force 10, a variation of the Paratrooper amusement ride
 "Force Ten" (song), a song by Rush from Hold Your Fire